was a town located in Nomi District, Ishikawa Prefecture, Japan.

As of 2003, the town had an estimated population of 14,804 and a density of 259.13 persons per km². The total area was 57.13 km².

On February 1, 2005, Tatsunokuchi, along with the towns of Neagari and Terai (all from Nomi District), was merged to create the city of Nomi and no longer exists as an independent municipality.

External links
 Official website of Nomi 

Dissolved municipalities of Ishikawa Prefecture
Nomi, Ishikawa